is a Japanese-language daily sports newspaper published by Sankei Shimbun. In 2014, it had a circulation of 1,270,000. The newspaper is known by its nickname .

Relating sports teams
 Kanto area - Tokyo Yakult Swallows (Nippon Professional Baseball)
 Kansai area  - Hanshin Tigers & Orix Buffaloes (Nippon Professional Baseball). Gamba Osaka & Cerezo Osaka (J.League)
 Tohoku area  - Tohoku Rakuten Golden Eagles (Nippon Professional Baseball). Vegalta Sendai (J.League)

See also
 Tokyo Marathon
 Osaka Women's Marathon (Osaka International Ladies Marathon)
 Kagawa Marugame Half Marathon
 Fujisankei Communications Group
 Japanese media

External links 
  Sanspo.com
  サンケイスポーツ電子版（産経電子版）  Sanspo denshi ban (Electronic newspaper delivery edition (Digital edition)) .

Daily newspapers published in Japan
Sports newspapers published in Japan
Fujisankei Communications Group
Mass media companies based in Tokyo
Companies based in Osaka Prefecture
Publications established in 1955
1955 establishments in Japan